The Valea Vințului is a right tributary of the river Mureș in Transylvania, Romania. It discharges into the Mureș in Vințu de Jos.

References

Rivers of Romania
Rivers of Alba County